The women's  +67 kg competition of the taekwondo events at the 2018 Mediterranean Games took place on the 30 of June at the Salou Pavilion.

Schedule 
All times are Central European Summer Time (UTC+2).

Results 

 Legend

 PTG — Won by Points Gap
 SUP — Won by superiority
 OT — Won on over time (Golden Point)
 DQ — Won by disqualification
 PUN — Won by punitive declaration
 WD — Won by withdrawal

Main bracket

References 

Taekwondo at the 2018 Mediterranean Games
2018 in women's taekwondo